Bardylis is a small genus of chalcid wasps belonging to the family Aphelinidae.
There are presently 9 described species.

References

Aphelinidae